Hackle Creek (also called Hacker Creek) is a stream in eastern Madison County in the U.S. state of Missouri. It is a tributary of Henderson Creek.

The stream headwaters arise about four miles southeast of Fredericktown and it flows east to its confluence with Henderson Creek about one-half mile northwest of Cornwall.

Hackle Creek derives its name from the local Hacker family, the original owners of the site.

See also
List of rivers of Missouri

References

Rivers of Madison County, Missouri
Rivers of Missouri